Mutual Friends is a 2013 American comedy film starring Caitlin FitzGerald, Cheyenne Jackson, Peter Scanavino, Michael Stahl-David, Christina Cole, Jennifer Lafleur, Ross Partridge, Michael Chernus and Vanessa Ray, directed and co-written by Matthew Watts; Amy Higgins (Watts’ wife), Frank Angones, Jessica Sue Burstein, Craig DiFolco, Ross Partridge and Olivia Silver also co-wrote the film.

It premiered at the 2013 Seattle International Film Festival and was picked up by FilmBuff for distribution. Mutual Friends also played at the Phoenix Film Festival, Raindance Film Festival, Dances with Films, Rhode Island International Film Festival and Sonoma International Film Festival

Plot

Mutual Friends revolves around a birthday party for Christoph (Cheyenne Jackson), planned by Liv (Caitlin FitzGerald) — who is his fiancé — and the people attending the party. Nate (Peter Scanavino), Liv’s good friend who wants to be more than that pops up and wants to revisit an incident between the two of them she’d rather leave behind. Christoph’s ex-girlfriend, Annie (Jennifer LaFleur), is invited to the surprise party, but is not happy he never asked her to marry him. Liv’s ex, Cody (Derek Cecil), also makes an appearance and reminds her why they split. Sammy (Ross Partridge), is a husband (and Liv’s older brother) who discovers his wife is having an affair. Paul (Michael Stahl-David) is married to Beatrice (Christina Cole) and isn’t taking the news about his impending fatherhood well. Though he was given a task, Thomas (Devin Burnam) hangs out with a stripper he’s hired instead of a bartender, buying inappropriate party favors for the party.

Background
Watts reportedly used his relationship with writer/co-producer and wife Amy Higgins as material for the script.

Cast

 Caitlin FitzGerald as Liv
 Cheyenne Jackson as Christoph
 Peter Scanavino as Nate
 Michael Stahl-David as Paul
 Christina Cole as Beatrice
 Jennifer Lafleur as Annie
 Ross Partridge as Sammy
 Devin Burnam as Thomas
 Michael Chernus as Chernus
 Vanessa Ray as Lucy 
 Derek Cecil as Cody

References

External links
 
 

2013 films
American comedy films
American independent films
2010s English-language films
2010s American films